Clostophis is a genus of air-breathing land snails, terrestrial pulmonate gastropod mollusks in the subfamily Hypselostomatinae  of the family Gastrocoptidae.

Species
 Clostophis incurvus Páll-Gergely & Vermeulen, 2020
 Clostophis infantilis Páll-Gergely, 2020
 Clostophis koilobasis Páll-Gergely & Vermeulen, 2020
 Clostophis multiformis Páll-Gergely & A. Reischütz, 2020
 Clostophis neglectus (van Benthem Jutting, 1961)
 Clostophis obtusus Páll-Gergely & Grego, 2020
 Clostophis platytrochus Páll-Gergely & Hunyadi, 2020
 Clostophis proboscideus (Panha & J. B. Burch, 1999)
 Clostophis sankeyi Benson, 1860
 Clostophis stochi (Páll-Gergely & Jochum, 2017)

References

 Panha, S. & Burch, J. B. (1999). Two new genera of pupillid land snails from Thailand (Pulmonata: Pupillidae: Gastrocoptinae). Malacological Review. 31/32(2): 143–153.

External links
 Benson, W. H. (1860). On Clostophis and Rhiostoma, new Burmese genera of land-shells. Annals and Magazine of Natural History. (3) 5(26): 95-97.
 Páll-Gergely, B., Hunyadi, A., Grego, J., Reischütz, A., Buczkó, K. & Vermeulen, J. J. (2020). Clostophis Benson, 1860, is not a monotypic diplommatinid but a speciose hypselostomatid (Gastropoda: Eupulmonata), with descriptions of six new species. Raffles Bulletin of Zoology. 68: 350–368.
 Kobelt W. (1902). Das Tierreich. Eine Zusammenstellung und Kennzeichnung der rezenten Tierformen. 16. Lieferung. Mollusca. Cyclophoridae. Das Tierreich. XXXIX + 662 pp., 1 map. [July]. Berlin (R. Friedländer).

Gastrocoptidae
Gastropod genera